"That's Life" is a single by American record producer and rapper 88-Keys featuring vocals by American rapper Mac Miller and Australian singer Sia. It was released on June 20, 2019, by Warner Records. 88-Keys obtained permission from Miller's family to use his contribution posthumously.

Background and release
Miller came up with the concept for the song stemming from a conversation he had with 88-Keys about relationships they were in at the time. Miller's part was recorded in New York City in February 2015, while he was working on his third studio album GO:OD AM.

A version of the song leaked online in May 2019, incorrectly titled "Benji the Dog", with Miller alone on vocals. 88-Keys responded to the leak days later, stating that it was a rough version and that the finished version would be officially released. On June 13, 2019, 88-Keys announced the release of "That's Life", also featuring Sia, and that he had obtained permission from Miller's estate to release the song posthumously. Regarding the song's development, 88-Keys said: "I played the song for Sia and she personally identified with the sentiments of the song and felt strongly about contributing her own thoughts on the subject matter."

"That's Life" was released as a single by Warner Records on June 20, 2019.

Personnel
Credits adapted from Tidal.

 88-Keys – primary artist, production, programming
 Mac Miller – featured artist, songwriting
 Sia – featured artist, songwriting, background vocals
 Alec Gould – songwriting
 Daniel Glogower – songwriting
 I. Rosenberg – songwriting
 J. O'Connell – songwriting
 M. LaValle – songwriting
 N. Ashford – songwriting
 Winston “Wentz” Nelson – songwriting
 V. Simpson – songwriting
 Irko – mixing
 Mauricio Iragorri – mastering
 Steve Baughman – mastering
 Frank Tatick – engineering assistant
 Zeke Mishanec – recording

Charts

References

2019 singles
2019 songs
Mac Miller songs
Sia (musician) songs
Songs released posthumously
Songs written by Sia (musician)
Songs written by Valerie Simpson
Songs written by Nickolas Ashford
Songs written by Mac Miller